The Lemming (formerly known as Lemming and before that as Life Color) is a Dutch glam rock band which scored three hits in the Dutch Top 40 between 1973 and 1975.

The band originally consisted of lead singer Wally McKey, guitarists Hans Vos and Harry Bruintjes, bassist Tinny Durrell and drummer Tony Gloudie. Of these only the first and the last named are still active for the band.

The band originally existed between 1973 and 1982 as Lemming and was relaunched as The Lemming in 2002 by Wally Mckey.

External links
  Website of The Lemming (WebCite archive)
  Lemming in the music encyclopedia of the Muziek Centrum Nederland
 Lemming by Adri Verhoef on Alex Gitlin's Music Site (WebCite archive)

Dutch hard rock musical groups